May De Silva (born ) is a Seychellois management expert who presently serves as the Commissioner of the Anti-Corruption Commission Seychelles since March 16, 2017.

Life and career
She was born and raised in Anse Royale, Mahé. She is an alumna of Ulster University where she obtained her Postgraduate degree after studying Management and Executive Leadership. She has been a member of various International Boards and Panels including the Gender Advisory Panel in the Office of the First and Deputy First Minister of Northern Ireland, the Belfast City Council for Good Relations Partnership and she has also chaired the Strategic Women's Reference Group of the Northern Ireland Policing Board. On 16 March 2017, she succeeded Lucy Athanasius as Chief Executive Officer of the Anti-Corruption Commission Seychelles following her appointment by Danny Faure, the President of the Republic of Seychelles. In July 2020, Ms De Silva was appointed on the Commission of Inquiry of the liquidation of the former Plantation Club Hotel which is chaired by ex President of the Court of Appeal, Justice MacGregor and the Auditor General, Mr Gamini Herath. Ms De Silva is also a member of the Seychelles National Committee of the Anti-Money Laundering and Counter Financing of Terrorism - appointed in February 2019.

In April 2021 Ms De Silva’s role changed from CEO to Commissioner of the Anti-Corruption Commission Seychelles which also took on a new mandate of overseeing the former Public Officers Ethics Commission. 

In a high-profile case De Silva presided over the investigation of former minister Dolor Ernesta.

References

1968 births
Living people
Seychellois women in politics
Alumni of Ulster University
People from Anse Royale